Beihe may refer to the following locations in China:

 Beihe, Leizhou (北和镇), town in Guangdong
 Beihe, Dingxing County (北河镇), town in Hebei
 Beihe Township (北河乡), Xingtang County, Hebei